Xuxa só para Baixinhos 11 or Sustentabilidade (also known as XSPB 11) is the thirty-fourth studio album and the twenty-seventh Portuguese album of Brazilian singer and TV host Xuxa Meneghel. It was released by Sony Music on September 18, 2011. The album is the eleventh in the collection Só Para Baixinhos.

Release and reception
Xuxa só para Baixinhos Vol. 11 - Sustentabilidade was released on September 18, 2011. The DVD received double platinum certifications with more than 100,000 copies sold and was one of the best selling of 2011, ranking ninth on a list of best selling DVDs of the year. The singles were "Um Novo Lugar" and "Além das Estrelas". It was released on DVD, CD, and Blu-ray format. The boxes for the DVDs are in Digipak format (which is considered a deluxe edition), with the insertion of the disc in recyclable material. The DVDs and CDs were accompanied by two 3D Anamorphic glasses. The DVD versions come with two 3D Anamorphic glasses (blue and red lenses). In order to publicize the launch, Xuxa held a press conference in a park and planted trees. This was the third album in the "Só Para Baixinhos" collection, released by the label Sony Music. This was the first 3D DVD produced in Brazil. Xuxa só para Baixinhos contains two music videos in 3D/Blu-ray format. A total of $1 million was invested in the CD's production, the most in Sony's history for the recording of a DVD.

Track listing

Personnel
General and Artistic Direction: Xuxa Meneghel
Direction: Paulo de Barros
Production: Luiz Cláudio Moreira and Mônica Muniz
Production Director: Junior Porto
Musical production: Ary Sperling
Musical Coordination: Vanessa Alves
Cinematography by: André Horta
Concept Design: Juan Díaz and Miguel Lessa
Hair and makeup: Luciene Araújo, Gabriela Besser and Sérgia Maria Lima de Almeida
Set design: Lueli Antunes
Art Production: Flávia Cristofaro, Guga Feijó
Graphic design: Duda Souza and Rodrigo Lima
CG: Rodrigo Oliveira and Sérgio Yamasaki 
Choreographies: Wagner Menezes (Fly)
Custom: Marcelo Cavalcanti
Make up: Vavá Torres
Edition: Tainá Diniz
Finishing: Bernardo Varela
Mixing and Mastering: Lillian Stock Bonzi 
Authorization and Programming: Alexandre Pereira and Fábio Pontual
Menus and Extras: Fausto Villanova and Gabriel Araújo 
3D Animation and Screen Creation: Daniel Lins and Alessandro Pires 
Composition and Effects: Agson Alessandre and Eliaze Mateus  
Version of Songs and Subtitles: Guilherme Reis (CD) / Val Andrade (Vídeo) / Luís Cláudio Barbosa (DVD) 
Spelling and Editing: Helo Lopes

Certifications

References

External links 
 Xuxa só para Baixinhos 11 at Discogs

2011 albums
2011 video albums
Xuxa video albums
Xuxa albums
Children's music albums by Brazilian artists
Portuguese-language video albums
Portuguese-language albums
Sony Music albums